Crab Brook is a tributary of Stony Brook in central New Jersey in the United States.

Course

See also
List of rivers of New Jersey

External links
USGS Coordinates in Google Maps

Tributaries of the Raritan River
Rivers of New Jersey
Rivers of Middlesex County, New Jersey